Darren Simon Brady (born 11 April 1981) is a Scottish retired footballer who played as a midfielder.

Career
Born in Glasgow, Brady started his career with Airdrieonians but left in 2001 after the club went into administration, though prior to it folding altogether. He had trials at Hibernian and Barcelona through Airdrie manager Steve Archibald's connections to those clubs, before joining Dundee United for the remainder of the 2000–01 season along with David McGuire, making one appearance from the bench.

He then spent two seasons with Livingston but failed to make an impact and played only twice , in the Scottish League Cup, spending the second year on loan at Raith Rovers where he played regularly, working under former Airdrie teammate Antonio Calderón as manager. A permanent move to Raith followed in 2003 and he remained there until January 2005, winning the Scottish Second Division title then being named captain in a struggling team, before moving to Partick Thistle where he experienced a relegation followed by promotion.

Brady transferred to Ross County in July 2007 where he again was part of a side that won the third tier championship, and then on to Forfar Athletic a year later, being signed by the same manager – Dick Campbell – who had brought him to Partick and Ross County. The second of his three seasons at the Angus club was ruined by a cruciate ligament injury to his knee. In July 2011, Junior side Pollok signed the midfielder. After a promising season, Brady was injured early in the 2012–13 season, and on returning, he was unable to replicate his form from before. He came on as a substitute in the last 30 minutes of the Central League Cup Final to help secure Pollok's 3–0 win against Ashfield. Brady later retired after serious knee injury prevented him carrying on playing.

Personal life
Brady's elder brother Garry was also a professional footballer, whose clubs included St Mirren.

Career statistics

Honours
Airdrieonians
Scottish Challenge Cup: 2000–01

Raith Rovers
Scottish Football League Second Division: 2002–03

Partick Thistle
Scottish Football League Second Division play-off winners: 2005–06

Ross County
Scottish Football League Second Division: 2007–08

References

External links

1981 births
Footballers from Glasgow
Living people
Airdrieonians F.C. (1878) players
Dundee United F.C. players
Livingston F.C. players
Raith Rovers F.C. players
Partick Thistle F.C. players
Ross County F.C. players
Forfar Athletic F.C. players
Scottish footballers
Scottish Premier League players
Scottish Football League players
Scottish Junior Football Association players
Association football midfielders
Pollok F.C. players